Bang Jun-seok (1 August 1970 – 26 March 2022) was a South Korean film score composer and music director. He was also a member of the experimental band U&Me Blue. 

Bang died of stomach cancer on March 26, 2022, in New York City.

Filmography 

Tell Me Something (1999)
Bloody Beach (2000)
Joint Security Area (2000)
The Coast Guard (2002)
Who Are You? (2002) – also producer
A Bizarre Love Triangle (2002) 
YMCA Baseball Team (2002) 
The Uninvited (2003) – music department staff
...ing (2003)
Oh! Brothers (2003)
Three... Extremes (2004)
So Cute (2004) – music department staff
R-Point (2004) – music department staff
Hi! Dharma 2: Showdown in Seoul (2004)
You Are My Sunshine (2005)
Mr. Socrates (2005) – music department staff
Peso (2005; short film) – also actor
Crying Fist (2005) 
The Fox Family (2006)
The City of Violence (2006)
Dasepo Naughty Girls (2006) – music department staff
The Old Garden (2006)
Radio Star (2006)
Drawing Paper (2007)
Nowhere to Turn (2007) – actor
A Good Day to Have an Affair (2007)
Paradise Murdered (2007)
The Happy Life (2007)
Two Faces of My Girlfriend (2007)
Viva! Love (2008)
Like Father, Like Son (2008) – music department staff
Sunny (2008)
Eye for an Eye (2008)
Go Go 70s (2008) – also screenwriter
Lies (2009; short film) – actor
If You Were Me 4 (2009) – segment "Blue Birds on the Desk"
Timeless (2009; short film)
Comfortable Distance (2009; short film)
Girlfriends (2009)
Dance Of Time (2009; documentary)
Insadong Scandal (2009)
A Little Pond (2009)
Camellia (2010) – segment "Love for Sale"
Troubleshooter (2010)
Heartbeat (2011)
Always (2011)
Couples (2011) 
The Thieves (2012) – music department staff
Jury (2013; short film) – music department staff
Hope (2013) 
Manshin: Ten Thousand Spirits (2013; documentary) – music department staff
Thuy (2013) 
The Throne (2015)
Veteran (2015)
The Magician (2015)
A Man and a Woman (2016)
Luck Key (2016)
Spy Nation (2016; documentary)
Misbehavior (2016) 
The Prison (2017)
Becoming Who I Was (2017; documentary) 
Reset (2017) 
The Battleship Island (2017) 
Anarchist from Colony (2017) 
The Swindlers (2017) 
Along with the Gods: The Two Worlds (2017) 
Be with You (2018)
Sunset in My Hometown (2018)
Along with the Gods: The Last 49 Days (2018)
Cheer Up, Mr. Lee (2019)
Tazza: One Eyed Jack (2019)
 The Book of Fish (2021)
 Escape from Mogadishu (2021)

Awards and nominations

State honors

Notes

References

External links 
 
 
 

1970 births
2022 deaths
South Korean film score composers
Male film score composers
South Korean male singer-songwriters
South Korean lyricists
South Korean record producers
Binghamton University alumni
South Korean expatriates in the United States
Blue Dragon Film Award winners
Deaths from cancer in New York (state)
Deaths from stomach cancer